Robert Hering (born 14 June 1990 in Gera) is a German sprinter who specialises in the 200 metres. His personal best time is 20.41 seconds, achieved at the 2009 German Athletics Championships in Ulm, where he won gold. He competed at the 2016 Summer Olympics on Germany's 4 × 100 m relay team which finished 9th in the heats and did not advance to the final.

See also
 German all-time top lists - 200 metres

References

External links 
 
 DLV profile 
 Profile bei ARD Sportschau 
 
 
 

1990 births
Living people
Sportspeople from Gera
German male sprinters
German national athletics champions
Olympic athletes of Germany
Athletes (track and field) at the 2016 Summer Olympics
World Athletics Championships athletes for Germany
21st-century German people